Riste Pandev (born 25 January 1994) is a Macedonian sprinter. He competed in the 100 metres event at the 2013 World Championships in Athletics. He holds the Macedonian record in the 100m with time of 10.61 placed in Pravets, Bulgaria on 15 June 2013. On 6 July 2014 he broke the Macedonian record on 200m with the time of 21.65 posted in La Chaux-de-Fonds, Switzerland.

Personal achievements

4 × 100 m with Kristijan Efremov, Riste Ajdarov, Sasho Golubic

References

1994 births
Living people
Macedonian male sprinters
Place of birth missing (living people)
World Athletics Championships athletes for North Macedonia
Athletes (track and field) at the 2015 European Games
European Games competitors for North Macedonia
People from Strumica Municipality
Athletes (track and field) at the 2016 Summer Olympics
Olympic athletes of North Macedonia